David Bertram Mullen (November 4, 1885 – October 28, 1940) was a provincial politician from Alberta, Canada. He served as a member of the Legislative Assembly of Alberta from 1935 to 1940, sitting with the Social Credit caucus in government. He served as the Minister of Agriculture from 1937 until his death in 1940 from a heart attack.

References

Alberta Social Credit Party MLAs
1940 deaths
1885 births
Members of the Executive Council of Alberta